Bourne Park may refer to:

 Bourne Park (football ground), former home of Sittingbourne F.C.
 Bourne Park House, a country house on Bourne Park Road, between Bishopsbourne and Bridge near Canterbury in Kent
 Bourne Paddock, a cricket ground in the grounds of Bourne Park House
 Bourne Park Reed Beds, a Local Nature Reserve on the southern outskirts of Ipswich in Suffolk